The 1985 season was the Cincinnati Bengals' 16th season in the National Football League (NFL), their 18th overall, and their second under head coach Sam Wyche.  Wide receiver Isaac Curtis, a premier Bengal for 12 years, retired shortly before training camp opened. Second-year quarterback Boomer Esiason replaced Ken Anderson. The Bengals set a club scoring record with 441 points.

Offseason

NFL Draft

Personnel

Staff

Roster

Regular season

Schedule

Note: Intra-division opponents are in bold text.

Game summaries

Week 1

Week 2

Week 3

Week 4

    
    
    
    
    
    
    
    
    
    

James Brooks 18 Rush, 133 Yds

Week 6

Week 8

Standings

Team leaders

Passing

Rushing

Receiving

Defensive

Kicking and punting

Special teams

Awards and honors
 Anthony Muñoz, AFC Pro Bowl selection

References

External links
 1985 Cincinnati Bengals at Pro-Football-Reference.com

Cincinnati Bengals
Cincinnati Bengals seasons
Cinc